The 110 metres hurdles event at the 2005 World Championships in Athletics was held at the Helsinki Olympic Stadium on August 10, 11 and 12.

The top three runners in each of the initial six heats automatically qualified for the semifinals.  The next six fastest runners from across the heats also qualified. There were three semifinal heats, and only the top two from each heat plus the next two fastest runners advanced to the final.

Medalists

Results
All times shown are in seconds.
Q denotes qualification by place.
q denotes qualification by time.
DNS denotes did not start.
DNF denotes did not finish.
AR denotes area record
NR denotes national record.
PB denotes personal best.
SB denotes season's best.

Round 1
August 10

Heat 1
 Thomas Blaschek, Germany 13.86s Q
 Allen Johnson, United States 13.92s Q
 Yoel Hernández, Cuba 14.03s Q
 Ivan Bitzi, Switzerland 14.26s
 Cédric Lavanne, France 14.49s
 Alexandros Theofanov, Greece 14.73s
 Todd Matthews-Jouda, Sudan 15.43s

Heat 2
 Liu Xiang, China 13.73s Q
 Redelén dos Santos, Brazil 13.74s Q
 Jonathan Nsenga, Belgium 13.89s Q
 Anier García, Cuba 14.01s q
 Elmar Lichtenegger, Austria 14.04s q
 Matti Niemi, Finland 14.18s
 Jackson Quiñónez, Ecuador 14.34s
 Baymurat Ashirmuradov, Turkmenistan 15.52s

Heat 3
 Ladji Doucouré, France 13.86s Q
 Mateus Facho Inocêncio, Brazil 13.96s Q
 Chris Pinnock, Jamaica 14.11s Q
 Gregory Sedoc, Netherlands 14.24s
 Sergiy Demydyuk, Ukraine 14.25s
 Karl Jennings, Canada 14.30s
 Sultan Tucker, Liberia 14.34s
 Andrea Giaconi, Italy DNS

Heat 4
 Shi Dongpeng, China 13.80s Q
 Terrence Trammell, United States 13.80s Q
 Igor Peremota, Russia 13.89s Q
 Robert Kronberg, Sweden 13.90s q
 Masato Naito, Japan 13.90s q
 Allan Scott, Great Britain 14.18s
 Peter Coghlan, Republic of Ireland 14.57s
 Hon Sing Tang, Hong Kong 14.83s

Heat 5
 Anselmo da Silva, Brazil 13.96s Q
 Dominique Arnold, United States 13.96s Q
 Marcel van der Westen, Netherlands 14.01s Q
 Paulo Villar, Colombia 14.12s
 Joseph-Berlioz Randriamihaja, Madagascar 14.18s
 Satoru Tanigawa, Japan 14.25s
 Felipe Vivancos, Spain 14.34s
 Julien M'Voutoukoulou, Congo 15.41s

Heat 6
 Dayron Robles, Cuba 13.83s Q
 Staņislavs Olijars, Latvia 13.86s Q
 Joel Brown, United States 13.90s Q
 Maurice Wignall, Jamaica 13.90s q
 Dudley Dorival, Haiti 14.02s q
 Wu Youjia, China 14.38s
 David Ilariani, Georgia 14.88s
 Suphan Wongsriphuck, Thailand 15.05s

Semifinals
August 11

Semifinal 1
 Ladji Doucouré, France 13.35s Q
  Dominique Arnold, United States 13.39s Q
 Shi Dongpeng, China 13.44s
 Yoel Hernández, Cuba 13.54s
 Igor Peremota, Russia 13.71s
 Redelén dos Santos, Brazil 13.88s
 Masato Naito, Japan 13.88s
 Dudley Dorival, Haiti 14.11s

Semifinal 2
 Terrence Trammell, United States 13.31s Q
 Liu Xiang, China 13.42s Q
 Staņislavs Olijars, Latvia 13.53s
 Anselmo da Silva, Brazil 13.63s
 Robert Kronberg, Sweden 13.69s
 Chris Pinnock, Jamaica 13.73s
 Jonathan Nsenga, Belgium 13.94s
 Anier García, Cuba 13.99s

Semifinal 3
 Allen Johnson, United States 13.23s Q
 Maurice Wignall, Jamaica 13.24s Q (SB)
 Mateus Facho Inocêncio, Brazil 13.39s q
 Joel Brown, United States 13.43s q
 Thomas Blaschek, Germany 13.45s
 Marcel van der Westen, Netherlands 13.63s
 Elmar Lichtenegger, Austria 13.74s
 Dayron Robles, Cuba 14.16s

Final
August 12

 Ladji Doucouré, France 13.07s
 Liu Xiang, China 13.08s
 Allen Johnson, United States 13.10s
  Dominique Arnold, United States 13.13s
 Terrence Trammell, United States 13.20s
 Joel Brown, United States 13.47s
 Maurice Wignall, Jamaica 13.47s
 Mateus Facho Inocêncio, Brazil 13.48s

External links
IAAF results, heats
IAAF results, semi finals
IAAF results, final

Hurdles
Sprint hurdles at the World Athletics Championships